Wavorly is an American rock band from Tupelo, Mississippi.

History
Wavorly formed in 2001 under the name Freshmen 15, and independently released two albums under this name. The group changed its name after signing to Flicker Records because they "didn't want to be thirty years old and be like, 'I'm in "Freshmen 15". I have three kids.'" The name Wavorly comes from a haunted mansion in West Point, Mississippi. Their major label debut, Conquering the Fear of Flight, was released on Flicker on June 12, 2007, and has lyrics significantly influenced by the writings of C. S. Lewis.

The band's single "Part One" received significant airplay on US Christian radio and was heavily rotated on the Gospel Music Channel's Rock Block. Also, it had been confirmed that Wavorly was in the process of finishing their next album, which was slated for a 2011 release. Rob Graves, producer of Conquering the Fear of Flight and other bands such as RED and Pillar, was confirmed as producer. Former RED guitarist Jasen Rauch had also been confirmed as a co-producer.
Wavorly released an EP entitled "The EP" On November 11, 2011.

Wavorly broke up on December 21, 2012, as they announced via Facebook.

Lead singer Dave Stovall joined forces with Christian rock band Audio Adrenaline in 2015.

Wavorly has since announced a reunion in 2017 via Facebook.

Members
Current members
Dave Stovall - lead vocals, rhythm guitar 
Matt Lott - bass
Ryan Coon - keyboards 
Former members 
Seth Farmer - vocals, lead guitar (2006-2012)
Trey Hill - drums (2001–2006)
Dan Isbell - guitar 
Jaime Hays - drums (2006–2010)
Teddy Boldt - drums (2010-2013)

Discography
Freshmen 15
Freshmen 15 (2002)
Hi-5 Pedestrian (2004)

Wavorly
Conquering the Fear of Flight (Flicker Records, 2007)
The EP (Independent, 2011)
Something Like Fiction (2013)
Movement One (2017)

References

External links
 

American Christian rock groups
Flicker Records artists
Rock music groups from Mississippi
Musical groups established in 2001